The Danish Sign Language family comprises three languages: Danish Sign Language, Norwegian Sign Language (including Malagasy Sign Language) and Icelandic Sign Language. It itself is a sub-language family within the larger French Sign Language family.

Ethnologue reports that Danish Sign Language is largely mutually intelligible with Swedish Sign, despite having been assigned different families by Wittmann (1991).

References

External links
 Aldersson, Russell R. and Lisa J. McEntee-Atalianis. 2007. A Lexical Comparison of Icelandic Sign Language and Danish Sign Language. Birkbeck Studies in Applied Linguistics Vol 2. A Lexical Comparison of Icelandic Sign Language and Danish Sign Language

 
French Sign Language family